Carden is a civil parish in Cheshire West and Chester, England. It contains ten buildings that are recorded in the National Heritage List for England as designated listed buildings.  The parish is entirely rural, and all the listed buildings are domestic or related to farming.

Key

Buildings

See also
Listed buildings in Clutton
Listed buildings in Broxton
Listed buildings in Duckington
Listed buildings in Tilston
Listed buildings in Stretton
Listed buildings in Barton

References
Citations

Sources

Listed buildings in Cheshire West and Chester
Lists of listed buildings in Cheshire